OMHS may refer to:
 Oak Mountain High School, Birmingham, Alabama, United States
 Oakland Mills High School, Columbia, Maryland, United States
 Owensboro Medical Health System Hospital in Owensboro, Kentucky, United States
 Owings Mills High School, Owings Mills, Maryland, United States
 Old Mill High School, Millersville, Maryland, United States